Filipinos in Portugal consist of migrants from the Philippines and their descendants.

Notable people
Chabeli Iglesias, born in Cascais to a Filipina mother and Spanish father

See also
Filipino Brazilians
Filipinos in Spain
Filipinos in Italy

References

Portugal
Ethnic groups in Portugal
Immigration to Portugal